Joseph Mott Thomas (23 August 1829 – 3 April 1910) was a member of the Wisconsin State Assembly in 1869, 1878 and 1879. He was a Republican. Thomas was born in Columbia, New York.

References

1829 births
1910 deaths
People from Herkimer County, New York
People from Richland County, Wisconsin
Republican Party members of the Wisconsin State Assembly